Yevgeny Chernov (born 31 January 1974) is a Russian sailor. He competed in the Finn event at the 2000 Summer Olympics.

References

External links
 

1974 births
Living people
Russian male sailors (sport)
Olympic sailors of Russia
Sailors at the 2000 Summer Olympics – Finn
Place of birth missing (living people)